Musotima aduncalis, also known as the maidenhair fairy moth, is a moth in the family Crambidae. It was described by Cajetan Felder, Rudolf Felder and Alois Friedrich Rogenhofer in 1875. This species is endemic to New Zealand.

Description 
The larvae are green in colour with a dark head. Adults are variable in colour, ranging from white to ochreous yellow.

Behaviour 
The larvae can be found on the underside of the fern fronds and create clear window like patches when consuming their host. The adult moth is on the wing from October to February.

Hosts 
The larvae feed on Adiantum species.

References

Moths described in 1875
Musotiminae
Moths of New Zealand
Endemic fauna of New Zealand
Endemic moths of New Zealand